Somatina rhodochila is a moth of the  family Geometridae. It is found in the Democratic Republic of Congo.

References

Moths described in 1932
Scopulini
Insects of the Democratic Republic of the Congo
Moths of Africa
Endemic fauna of the Democratic Republic of the Congo